Aatma may refer to:
 Athma (film), a 1993 horror film
 Aatma (2006 film), a 2006 horror film
 Aatma - Feel It Around You, a 2013 psychological horror film
 Aatma (album), a 2001 album by Colonial Cousins

as per Rajat Parmar aatma or soul is a nothing else but our subconscious mind itself.
Subconscious mind have a very strong Bonding between the nature and the mysterious powers of the universe called God. in the visible world everything was created earlier in the conscious mind before it was invented. and the conscious mind will be memories for lifetime.
but in the case of subconscious mind the working are of  the subconscious mind is far from limits of the conscious mind, thus it has no clues for memories